The Wind That Shakes the Barley is the ninth studio album by the Canadian singer, songwriter, accordionist, harpist, and pianist Loreena McKennitt, which was released on November 12, 2010.

Track listing

 "As I Roved Out" (traditional) – 4:59
 "On a Bright May Morning" (traditional) – 5:08
 "Brian Boru's March" (traditional) – 3:51
 "Down by the Sally Gardens" (traditional, lyrics by W. B. Yeats) – 5:39
 "The Star of the County Down" (traditional) – 3:34
 "The Wind That Shakes the Barley" (traditional, lyrics by Robert Dwyer Joyce) – 6:01
 "The Death of Queen Jane" (traditional) – 6:04
 "The Emigration Tunes" (McKennitt) – 4:42
 "The Parting Glass" (traditional) – 5:13

Personnel
Loreena McKennitt – vocals (1, 2, 4, 5, 6, 7, 9), keyboards (1, 5, 6, 8), accordion (1, 7, 8) and harp (2, 3, 4, 7)
Brian Hughes – Irish bouzouki (1, 3, 5, 7), drone (3), and electric (2, 4, 6, 8) & acoustic guitar (1, 8)
Hugh Marsh – violin (1– 9)
Caroline Lavelle – cello (1– 8)
Ben Grossman – hurdy-gurdy drone (6), bodhrán (1, 6), frame drum (3), taber (3), triangle (1), bells (3, 5), and shaker (5)
Ian Harper – uilleann pipes (1, 4, 5, 8) and whistle (3, 5, 6, 8)
Tony McManus – acoustic guitar (2, 4, 7, 9)
Jeff Bird – mandola (1, 5), mandolin (3, 6, 8) and acoustic bass (1, 8)
Pat Simmonds – acoustic guitar (1, 5, 6, 8), button accordion (3, 5)
Andrew Collins – mandolin (2, 7), mandocello (7)
Brian Taheny – mandolin (4)
Chris Gartner – bass (4)
Andrew Downing – acoustic bass (5)
Jason Fowler – acoustic guitar (5)
Jeff Wolpert – recording and mixing

Chart positions

References

2010 albums
Loreena McKennitt albums